Rosanny Zayas is an American actress. She is best known for her role as Sophie Suarez in The L Word: Generation Q  (2019–present). Zayas has acted in The Code, Orange Is the New Black, and Elementary.

Early life and education 
Zayas was born in Brooklyn and raised in the Ozone Park neighborhood of Queens, New York to an Afro-Dominican family. She attended Forest Hills High School, where she was a member of the choral group and began acting at the encouragement of the drama teacher.

She received her bachelor's degree from Queens College, where she studied acting under Claudia Fieldstein. Zayas graduated from the Juilliard School with her master of fine arts degree, in the program's second graduate class. While at Juilliard, her performance in the titular role of José's Marisol received positive reception and helped her break into the New York theater scene.

Career 
Zayas appeared in the Public Theater Mobile Unit's 2018 production of A Midsummer Night's Dream as Helena. Elisabeth Vincentelli wrote of her performance for the New York Times, "Best is Rosanny Zayas as Helena, who demonstrates nimble comic timing and always seems to be completely in the moment — a rarer ability than you’d think, even among the best actors."

Since 2019 she been a lead cast member on The L Word: Generation Q as Sophie Suarez, an Afro-Latina producer on Alice Pieszecki's talk show The Alice Show. When Zayas was a high school student, she was an avid viewer of the original series.

Zayas has acted in Modern Persuasion, Orange is the New Black, The Code, and Elementary. She also has a supporting role in the upcoming mini-series Angelyne and she is a series regular in the upcoming Netflix series Echoes.

References

External links 
 
Rosanny Zayas at Instagram

Year of birth missing (living people)
Living people
21st-century American actresses
Actresses from New York City
Entertainers from New York City
Forest Hills High School (New York) alumni
Queens College, City University of New York alumni
Juilliard School alumni
American people of Dominican Republic descent
Afro–Latin American
People from Ozone Park, Queens
American stage actresses
People from Brooklyn